Johan Herman Andersson (born 30 October 1974) is a Swedish former footballer who played as a defender. He made 42 Allsvenskan appearances for Djurgårdens IF, and scored three goals, 118 for Hammarby IF (ten goals), and 39 for GIF Sundsvall (no goals).

Club career
Andersson started his career in Gröndals IK and joined Djurgårdens IF Fotboll in the age of twelve. In 1998, he joined rival Hammarby IF to play in Allsvenskan. In Hammarby, he was a part of the 2001 Allsvenskan winning team. In 2004, he moved to GIF Sundsvall.

In 2007, Andersson joined his mother club Gröndals IK for matches in Division 1 Norra.

International career 
He appeared once for the Sweden national football B team in 1995.

Honours 

 Djurgårdens IF
 Division 1 Norra: 1994

 Hammarby IF
 Allsvenskan: 2001

References

Swedish footballers
Djurgårdens IF Fotboll players
1974 births
Living people
Gröndals IK players
Association football defenders
Hammarby Fotboll players
GIF Sundsvall players
Allsvenskan players
Ettan Fotboll players
Sportspeople from Umeå